Alexander Lubotzky (born 28 June 1956) is an Israeli mathematician and former politician who is currently a professor at the Weizmann Institute of Science and an adjunct professor at Yale University. He served as a member of the Knesset for The Third Way party between 1996 and 1999. In 2018 he won the Israel Prize for his accomplishments in mathematics and computer science.

Biography
Alexander (Alex) Lubotzky was born in Tel Aviv to Holocaust survivors. His father, Iser Lubotzky was a Partisan, Irgun officer and the legal advisor of Herut. After school, Lubotzky did his IDF national service as a captain officer in a special intelligence and communication unit. He studied mathematics at Bar-Ilan University during highschool, gaining a BA (summa cum laude) and continuing directly with studying for his PhD under the supervision of Hillel Furstenberg.

Lubotzky married Yardenna (daughter of Murray Roston), a lecturer in Art History and English, in 1980. The couple had six children; the oldest, Asael Lubotzky, was injured severely in the Battle of Bint Jbeil in Lebanon, while serving as an officer in the IDF in the 2006 Lebanon war and after his rehabilitation became a physician.

Academic career
He worked as a professor of mathematics at the Hebrew University, becoming head of the department (1994–1996). He has been a visiting professor at the Institute for Advanced Study in Princeton, Stanford, and the University of Chicago, with visits at Columbia, Yale, NYU and ETH Zurich.
Lubotzky holds a Maurice and Clara Weil Chair in mathematics at the Einstein Institute of Mathematics of the Hebrew University of Jerusalem. He is known for contributions to geometric group theory, the study of lattices in Lie groups, representation theory of discrete groups and Kazhdan's property (T), the study of subgroup growth and applications of group theory to combinatorics and computer science (expander graphs) and error correcting codes.

Lubotzky received the Erdős Prize in 1990. In the years 1994–1996 Lubotzky was the chairman of Einstein Institute of Mathematics at the Hebrew University of Jerusalem.

In 1992 Lubotzky was a recipient of the Sunyer i Balaguer Prize from the Institut d'Estudis Catalans for his book "Discrete Groups Expanding Graphs and Invariant Measures" and again in 2002 with Dan Segal for their book "Subgroup Growth". In 2002 he has received the Rothschild Prize in mathematics. Lubotzky  is listed as an ISI highly cited researcher in mathematics since 2003.

Lubotzky was elected a foreign member of the American Academy of Arts and Sciences in 2005. In 2005-6 He led in the Institute for Advanced Study in Princeton a year long program on "Pro-finite groups and the congruence subgroup problem". In 2006, he got an honorary degree from the University of Chicago for his contribution to Modern mathematics.

In 2008 Lubotzky received the European Research Council (ERC) advanced grant for exceptional established research leaders. In 2011 Lubotzky was chosen to be the keynote speaker at the joint meeting of the American Mathematical Society (AMS) and the Mathematical Association of America (MAA) in New Orleans. Lubotzky's keynote address in front of the conference's 6,000 attendees marked the first time that an Israeli was the keynote speaker at one of these conferences. In 2012 he was a visiting researcher at Microsoft Research Center.

In 2021 he became a professor at the Weizmann Institute of Science.

Political career
A founding member of The Third Way in March 1996, he chaired its secretariat and was elected to the Knesset in the May 1996 elections. He served as a member of the Knesset's Foreign Affairs and Defense Committee; Constitution, Law and Justice Committee; Status of Women Committee and the Science and Technology Committee, and chaired the subcommittee on the Y2K Bug.

As an MK, Lubotzky was mainly known for his compromise proposals on religious issues and pluralism. He was actively involved in setting up a solution to the conversion bill crisis via the Ne'eman Commission, working to avoid a conflict between Israel and the Jewish Diaspora. Lubotzky also co-drafted a comprehensive proposal for a new covenant for religion-state affairs in Israel with MK Yossi Beilin.

Awards and recognition

In 2014, he was elected to the Israel Academy of Sciences and Humanities. In 2015 Lubotzky received the European Research Council (ERC) advanced grant for exceptional established research leaders, becoming one of the only researchers receiving the grant twice.

In honor of Lubotzky's sixtieth birthday The Israel Institute for Advanced Studies hosted a conference (Midrasha) from 5 November through 11 November 2016, with scholars from around the world convening to celebrate his work, impact, and collaborations.

In 2018 Lubotzky received the Israel Prize, for mathematics. Lubotzky gave a Plenary lecture in the 2018 International Congress of Mathematicians at Rio de Janeiro, Brazil. In 2021 Lubotzky received the European Research Council (ERC) advanced grant for exceptional established research leaders, becoming the only researcher receiving the advanced grant three times. In 2014, he was elected to the Israel Academy of Sciences and Humanities. In 2015 Lubotzky received the European Research Council (ERC) advanced grant for exceptional established research leaders, becoming one of the only researchers receiving the grant twice.

In 2018 Lubotzky received the Israel Prize, for mathematics. Lubotzky gave a Plenary lecture in the 2018 International Congress of Mathematicians at Rio de Janeiro, Brazil. In 2021 Lubotzky received the European Research Council (ERC) advanced grant for exceptional established research leaders, becoming the only researcher receiving the advanced grant three times.
 1991: Erdős Prize for the best Israeli mathematician/computer scientist under the age of 40
 1993: Ferran Sunyer i Balaguer Prize for the book Discrete groups, Expanding Graphs and Invariant Reassures
 2002: The Rothschild Prize
 2002: Ferran Sunyer i Balaguer Prize for the book Subgroup growth
 2003: ISI list of Highly Cited Researchers 
 2005: Elected Foreign Honorary Member of the American Academy of Arts and Sciences
 2006: Honorary doctoral degree from the University of Chicago
 2014: Elected to the Israel Academy of Sciences and Humanities
 2018: Israel Prize for mathematics

Published works
 
 
 
 
מבנים אלגבריים: חבורות, חוגים ושדות, 2018

References

External links

Alexander Lubotzky's webpage, Hebrew University

Alexander Lubotzky at the Mathematical Reviews author summary

1956 births
Scientists from Tel Aviv
20th-century  Israeli  mathematicians
21st-century  Israeli  mathematicians
Bar-Ilan University alumni
Jewish scientists
Academic staff of the Hebrew University of Jerusalem
Fellows of the American Academy of Arts and Sciences
Members of the Israel Academy of Sciences and Humanities
Israel Prize in mathematics recipients
Israeli Orthodox Jews
Living people
Third Way (Israel) politicians
Centre Party (Israel) politicians
Jewish Israeli politicians
Israeli settlers
Members of the 14th Knesset (1996–1999)
Yale University faculty
Institute for Advanced Study visiting scholars
Erdős Prize recipients